This is a list of schools in South Gloucestershire, England.

State-funded schools

Primary schools 

Abbotswood Primary School, Yate
Alexander Hosea Primary School, Wickwar
Almondsbury CE Primary School, Almondsbury
Bailey's Court Primary School, Bradley Stoke
Barley Close Community Primary School, Mangotsfield
Barrs Court Primary School, Barrs Court
Beacon Rise Primary School, Kingswood
Blackhorse Primary School, Emersons Green
Bowsland Green Primary School, Bradley Stoke
Bradley Stoke Community School, Bradley Stoke
Broadway Infant School, Yate
Bromley Heath Infant School, Downend
Bromley Heath Junior School, Downend
Cadbury Heath Primary School, Warmley
Callicroft Primary School, Patchway
Charborough Road Primary School, Filton
Charfield Primary School, Charfield
Charlton Wood Primary Academy, Patchway
Cherry Garden Primary School, Bitton
Christ Church Hanham CE Primary School, Hanham
Christ Church CE Infant School, Downend
Christ Church CE Junior School, Downend
Christ The King RC Primary School, Thornbury
Coniston Primary School, Patchway
Courtney Primary School, Kingswood
Crossways Infant School, Thornbury
Crossways Junior School, Thornbury
Elm Park Primary School, Winterbourne
Emersons Green Primary School, Emersons Green
Filton Hill Primary School, Filton
Frampton Cotterell CE Primary School, Frampton Cotterell
Frenchay CE Primary School, Frenchay
Gillingstool Primary School, Thornbury
Hambrook Primary School, Hambrook
Hanham Abbots Junior School, Hanham
Hawkesbury CE Primary School, Hawkesbury Upton
Holy Family RC Primary School, Patchway
Holy Trinity Primary School, Bradley Stoke
Horton CE Primary School, Horton
Iron Acton CE Primary School, Iron Acton
Kings' Forest Primary School, Kingswood
King's Oak Academy, Kingswood
Little Stoke Primary School, Little Stoke
Longwell Green Primary School, Longwell Green
Lyde Green Primary School, Emersons Green
Mangotsfield CE Primary School, Mangotsfield
The Manor CE Primary School, Coalpit Heath
Manorbrook Primary School, Thornbury
Marshfield CE Primary School, Marshfield
Meadowbrook Primary School, Bradley Stoke
The Meadows Primary School, Bitton
North Road Community Primary School, Yate
Old Sodbury CE Primary School, Old Sodbury
Oldbury on Severn CE Primary School, Oldbury-on-Severn
Olveston CE Primary School, Olveston
Our Lady of Lourdes RC Primary School, Kingswood
The Park Primary School, Kingswood
Parkwall Primary School, Cadbury Heath
Pucklechurch CE Primary School, Pucklechurch
Rangeworthy CE Primary School, Rangeworthy
Raysfield Primary School, Chipping Sodbury
Redfield Edge Primary School, Oldland Common
The Ridge Junior School, Yate
St Andrew's CE Primary School, Cromhall
St Anne's CE Primary School, Oldland Common
St Augustine of Canterbury RC Primary School, Downend
St Barnabas CE Primary School, Warmley
St Chad's Patchway CE Primary School, Patchway
St Helen's CE Primary School, Alveston
St John's Mead CE Primary School, Chipping Sodbury
St Mary's CE Primary School, Thornbury
St Mary's CE Primary School, Yate
St Mary's RC Primary School, Bradley Stoke
St Michael's CE Primary School, Stoke Gifford
St Michael's CE Primary School, Winterbourne
St Paul's RC Primary School, Yate
St Peter's CE/Methodist Primary, Pilning
St Stephen's CE Junior School, Soundwell
St Stephen's Infant School, Soundwell
Samuel White's Infant School, Hanham
Severn Beach Primary School, Severn Beach
Shields Road Primary School, Northville
Stanbridge Primary School, Downend
Staple Hill Primary School, Staple Hill
Stoke Lodge Primary School, Patchway
Tortworth Primary School, Tortworth
Trinity CE Primary School, Acton Turville
Tyndale Primary School, Yate
The Tynings School, Staple Hill
Wallscourt Farm Academy, Stoke Gifford
Watermore Primary School, Frampton Cotterel
Wellesley Primary School, Yate
Wheatfield Primary School, Bradley Stoke
Wick CE Primary School, Wick
Woodlands Primary School, Yate

Secondary schools 

Abbeywood Community School, Stoke Gifford
Bradley Stoke Community School, Bradley Stoke
Brimsham Green School, Yate
The Castle School, Thornbury
Chipping Sodbury School, Chipping Sodbury
Digitech Studio School, Warmley
Downend School, Downend
Hanham Woods Academy, Hanham
John Cabot Academy, Kingswood
King's Oak Academy, Kingswood
Mangotsfield School, Mangotsfield
Marlwood School, Alveston
Patchway Community School, Almondsbury
Sir Bernard Lovell Academy, Oldland Common
Winterbourne Academy, Winterbourne
Yate Academy, Yate

Special and alternative schools 
Culverhill School, Yate
New Horizons Learning Centre, Kingswood
New Siblands School, Thornbury
Pathways Learning Centre, Downend
SGS Pegasus School, Patchway
Warmley Park School, Warmley

Further education 
South Gloucestershire and Stroud College

Independent schools

Primary and preparatory schools 
Tockington Manor School, Tockington

Senior and all-through schools 
Immanuel Christian School, Westerleigh

Special and alternative schools
Aurora Hedgeway School, Pilning
Neptune School, Warmley
Sheiling School, Thornbury

South Gloucestershire
Schools in South Gloucestershire District
Schools